Canadian Family Physician (French: Le Médecin de famille canadien) is a monthly peer-reviewed open-access medical journal published by the College of Family Physicians of Canada. It provides continuing medical education for family physicians and other primary care clinicians. The journal publishes original articles presenting a family medicine perspective to clinical medicine through approaches to common clinical conditions and evidence-based clinical reviews intended to assist family physicians in patient care. Most articles are published in both English and French. The journal was established in 1967 and the editor-in-chief is Nicholas Pimlott (University of Toronto).

Abstracting and indexing
The journal is abstracted and indexed in the following databases:

According to the Journal Citation Reports, its 2020 impact factor is 3.275.

See also
American Family Physician
Canadian Medical Association Journal

References

External links

Monthly journals
Open access journals
Publications established in 1967
Multilingual journals
1967 establishments in Canada
Family medicine journals